John Stanly may refer to:
 John Stanly (politician) (1774–1834), U.S. congressman from North Carolina
 John Carruthers Stanly (1774–1845), slave owner and free black resident
 John Wright Stanly, Revolutionary War veteran and privateer, father of both the above
 John Wright Stanly House, New Bern, Craven County, North Carolina
 SS John Wright Stanly, a Liberty ship

See also
 John Stanley (disambiguation)